The Northern Times was a newspaper published in Carnarvon, Western Australia from 1905–1983.

History 
The Northern Times was published from 26 August 1905 to 26 August 1983 in Carnarvon, Western Australia.

It absorbed the Geraldton-Greenough Sun and changed title to the North West Telegraph.

It was established as "a paper for the North", with a distribution area covering Broome, Carnarvon, Kununurra, Meekatharra, Wyndham, Cue, Mount Magnet, Mullewa, Sandstone, Wiluna and Yalgoo and was published weekly. The editor was Hugh Bismarck Geyer.

Digitisation 
The paper has been digitised as part of the Australian National Digitisation Program of the National Library of Australia.

See also 
Pilbara newspapers
West Australian Newspapers
List of newspapers in Western Australia

Further reading 
 A history of The Northern Times by Lauritz Andrew

References

External links 
 

Defunct newspapers published in Western Australia
1905 establishments in Australia
Publications established in 1905
1983 disestablishments in Australia
Publications disestablished in 1983
Newspapers of the Mid West region of Western Australia